USA is a live album by the English band King Crimson, released in 1975. It was recorded at the Casino, Asbury Park, New Jersey, on 28 June 1974, except “21st Century Schizoid Man”, which was recorded at the Palace Theatre, Providence, Rhode Island, United States, on 30 June 1974. Violin and electric piano overdubs by Eddie Jobson were recorded at Olympic Studios, London in 1975.

Live recording was performed by George Chkiantz and David Hewitt using the Record Plant Remote Truck. 

“Asbury Park” and “Easy Money” were edited to about half their original lengths for the LP release. The unedited versions were released digitally on dgmlive.com in 2005, along with the rest of the show in original running order.

The album opens with a brief excerpt of "The Heavenly Music Corporation" from (No Pussyfooting), an album Robert Fripp recorded with musician and producer Brian Eno.  While it was not listed as a separate track on the original album, it is present on all releases. 

Jobson plays violin on “Larks’ Tongues in Aspic (Part II)” and “21st Century Schizoid Man”, and Fender electric piano on “Lament” to improve the poor sound quality of the original parts played by  David Cross. 

Original vinyl releases contain audio content in both the lead-in grooves to both sides of the album, and in side two's run-out groove.  In the latter case, the audience's applause following "21st Century Schizoid Man" continues through side two's final locked groove, causing the applause to continue on manual turntables as long as the phonograph needle remains on the record.

There have been four releases of the album:
 Original vinyl release in 1975.  Includes tracks 1 - 7 (although track 1 & 2 are combined) with Eddie Jobson's overdubs.
 30th Anniversary Remaster released 2002.  Added tracks 8 & 9 to original release, credited track 1.
 2005 mix of original multi-track tapes by Ronan Chris Murphy at DGM.  Released as download from dgmlive.com in 2005 and on CD as disc two of The Collectable King Crimson Vol. 1 in 2006.  This edition is now the full Asbury Park concert, without overdubs, and in the proper running order.  Includes all tracks, with the uncut versions of "Asbury Park" and "Easy Money"; "21st Century Schizoid Man" is moved to be the last track and is now the version from Asbury Park rather than Providence, Rhode Island. Does not include Eddie Jobson's overdubs.
 2013 mix by original multi-track tapes by Robert Fripp, Tony Arnold and David Singleton at the Courthouse, Cranborne, Dorset.  Same track order and versions as release #3.  Splits improv at end of track 6 into its own track.  This mix is available on The Road to Red and the 40th Anniversary edition of USA.

Track listing

Personnel
King Crimson
Robert Fripp – guitar, Mellotron
John Wetton – bass guitar, vocals
David Cross – violin, viola, Mellotron, electric piano (except on 2,3,7 of original release)
Bill Bruford – drums, percussion

Additional musician
Eddie Jobson – violin (2 & 7), electric piano (3)

Charts

References

1975 live albums
King Crimson live albums
Atlantic Records live albums
Island Records live albums